HMS Halsham was one of 93 ships of the  of inshore minesweepers of the Royal Navy. Their names were all chosen from villages ending in -ham. The minesweeper was named after Halsham in the East Riding of Yorkshire.

She was transferred from the Royal Navy to Royal Air Force duties in 1966 and renamed No.5002 (later No.5012) and converted to a research and trials vessel for Royal Aircraft Establishment, Farnborough. By 1972, she was the only remaining RAF-operated marine asset, and to provide continued efficient management she was transferred to the Royal Corps of Transport's civilian fleet and renamed Richard George Masters. Private Masters was the sole recipient of the Victoria Cross in the Royal Army Service Corps during the First World War.

Notes

References
Blackman, R.V.B. ed. Jane's Fighting Ships (1953)

 

Ham-class minesweepers
Royal Navy ship names
1953 ships